This is a list of Panjabi films of the 1960s. For a complete alphabetical list, see :Category:Punjabi films.

1960s

References

External links 
 Punjabi films at the Internet Movie Database

1960s
Lists of 1960s films
Films